Karaka may refer to the following:

Karaka (tree), a tree endemic to New Zealand
Karaka, New Zealand, a town in New Zealand
Karaka, a concept in Vedic astrology (Jyotisha)
Karaka (star), a star in the Apus constellation
Dosabhai Framji Karaka (1829–1902), Indian newspaper editor and historian